Corsica is a large French island in the Mediterranean Sea.

It may also refer to:

 Corsica, Pennsylvania, a town in the United States
 Corsica, South Dakota, a town in the United States
 Chevrolet Corsica, an automobile model
 "Corsica and The Satyr", a painting by Artemisia Gentileschi
 Corsica, a frog in the webcomic Sluggy Freelance
 Corsica (album), a folk music album by Petru Guelfucci

See also 
 Corsican (disambiguation)
 Corse (disambiguation)
 Corsa (disambiguation)